Longchuan is a town of Zhuzhou County, Hunan, China. Amalgamating the former Wangshiwan and Tangshi two townships, the town was established on November 26, 2015. The town is divided into 25 villages and a community, its administrative centre is Huashi Village (花石村).

Subdivisions

External links
 Official site

References

Divisions of Zhuzhou County